William Brian Powell (October 10, 1973 – October 5, 2009) was a Major League Baseball pitcher from Bainbridge, Georgia, who played in the majors from  to  for the Detroit Tigers, Houston Astros, Philadelphia Phillies, and San Francisco Giants. In 2001, he pitched a no-hitter for the minor league baseball team, New Orleans Zephyrs, then the Astros Triple-A team. In 2005, he played again for the Zephyrs, then the Triple-A affiliate of the Washington Nationals. He played collegiate baseball for the University of Georgia and led the Southeastern Conference in strikeouts during the 1995 season.

Death
He died on October 5, 2009, in Tallahassee, Florida, of a self-inflicted gunshot wound.

References

External links

1973 births
2009 deaths
Major League Baseball pitchers
Baseball players from Georgia (U.S. state)
Detroit Tigers players
Houston Astros players
San Francisco Giants players
Philadelphia Phillies players
Jamestown Jammers players
Lakeland Tigers players
Jacksonville Suns players
Toledo Mud Hens players
New Orleans Zephyrs players
Scranton/Wilkes-Barre Red Barons players
Fresno Grizzlies players
Suicides by firearm in Florida
2009 suicides